Atropa is a genus of flowering plants in the nightshade family, Solanaceae: tall, calcicole, herbaceous perennials (rhizomatous hemicryptophytes), bearing large leaves and glossy berries particularly dangerous to children, due to their combination of an attractive, cherry-like appearance with a high toxicity. Atropa species favour temperate climates and alkaline soils, often growing in light shade in woodland environments associated with limestone hills and mountains. Their seeds can remain viable in the soil for long periods, germinating when the soil of sites in which plants once grew (but from which plants have long been absent) is disturbed by human activity or by natural causes, e.g. the windthrow of trees (a property shared by the seeds of other Solanaceae in tribe Hyoscyameae e.g. those of Hyoscyamus spp., the henbanes). The best-known member of the genus Atropa is deadly nightshade (A. belladonna) - the poisonous plant par excellence in the minds of many. The pharmacologically active ingredients of Atropa species include atropine, scopolamine, and hyoscyamine, all tropane alkaloids having anticholinergic, deliriant, antispasmodic and mydriatic properties. The genus is named for Άτροπος (Atropos) - lit. 'she who may not be turned (aside)' - one of the Three Fates and cutter of the thread of life / bringer of death - in reference to the extreme toxicity of A.belladonna and its fellow species - of which three others are currently accepted.

In some older classifications, the mandrake (Mandragora officinarum) has been placed in the genus Atropa, under the binomial Atropa mandragora.

Species
 Atropa acuminata Royle ex Lindl. –  Indian belladonna/maitbrand (Kashmir and adjoining regions of India, Pakistan and Afghanistan, also N. Iran). Endangered. Accepted species.
 Atropa acuminata Royle ex Miers – (not an accepted species, though probably referable to the species above) is reported to occur not only in Kashmir, but also in Iran and Mongolia - which would make it the easternmost of the Atropa species, and possibly of disjunct distribution.
 Atropa baetica Willk. –  Andalusian belladonna / tabaco gordo / tabba (S. and S.E. Spain and W. North Africa). Endangered. Accepted species.
 Atropa belladonna L. – Belladonna/deadly nightshade (Europe, Western Asia and North Africa). A very variable species with a very extensive distribution, the which factors have contributed to the description of species not currently accepted. A.belladonna itself is an accepted species.
 Atropa belladonna ssp. caucasica (Kreyer)Avet. – Caucasian Belladonna ( Caucasus, Turkey, Iran, Balkans(?)).
 Atropa komarovii Blin.& Shalyt – Turkmenistan belladonna (Kopet Dag range dividing Iran from Turkmenistan and adjoining regions in N.E. (Caspian) Iran).
 Atropa pallidiflora Schönb.-Tem. – Hyrcanian belladonna (Caspian Hyrcanian mixed forests, notably those of Mazandaran Province, N. Iran, also Afghanistan). Accepted species.

The genus Atropa is currently under review, so changes in nomenclature are likely, once said review is complete. It will be seen from the above that there is an overlap in the respective distributions of A. acuminata, A. komarovii and A. pallidiflora in the lush Hyrcanian forests of Northern Iran, and it is possible that some or all of these species may yet be subsumed in the concept Atropa belladonna. A. belladonna itself (including its variety caucasica) is also present in the Hyrcanian forests and vol. 100 of Flora Iranica includes a useful key with which to distinguish the four species occurring in northern Iran. Data on A. pallidiflora and A. acuminata Royle ex Miers are neither abundant nor readily accessible on the Internet at present. The reported presence of an Atropa species in Mongolia is intriguing, given that country's relative remoteness from Kashmir and its (Kashmir's) well-attested population of Atropa acuminata Royle ex Lindl. The unequivocal presence of Atropa in the Eastern Himalaya would go at least some way to bridging the gap between Kashmiri and Mongolian populations of this genus. Some light might be cast upon this problem by the gaining of a better knowledge of the rare and poorly-known monotypic genus Pauia, found in Arunachal Pradesh and adjoining areas of Assam. The single species Pauia belladonna Deb and Dutta is described as bearing a marked similarity to Atropa acuminata Royle ex Lindl. and may yet prove to be referable to the genus Atropa, after all.

References

 
Entheogens
Solanaceae genera